The Nebraska Cornhuskers baseball team was a baseball team that represented the University of Nebraska–Lincoln in the 2022 NCAA Division I baseball season. The Cornhuskers were members of the Big Ten Conference and played their home games at Haymarket Park in Lincoln, Nebraska. They were led by third-year head coach Will Bolt.

Previous season
The Cornhuskers finished the 2021 NCAA Division I baseball season 31–12 overall (31–12 conference) and first place in conference standings, as the season was limited to only conference games for all Big Ten teams due to the COVID-19 pandemic.

Preseason
For the 2022 Big Ten Conference poll, Nebraska was voted to finish in first by the Big Ten Coaches.

Roster

Schedule

! style="" | Regular Season
|- valign="top"

|- align="center" bgcolor="#ffcccc"
| 1 || February 18 || at  || Don Sanders Stadium • Huntsville, Texas || 5–8 || Wesneski (1–0) || Olson (0–1) || Lusk (1) || 423 || 0–1 || –
|- align="center" bgcolor="#ffcccc"
| 2 || February 19 || at Sam Houston State || Don Sanders Stadium • Huntsville, Texas || 1–5 || Atkinson (1–0) || Schanaman (0–1) || None || 1,488 || 0–2 || –
|- align="center" bgcolor="#ccffcc"
| 3 || February 19 || at Sam Houston State || Don Sanders Stadium • Huntsville, Texas || 12–9 || Ornelas (1–0) || Rudis (0–1) || None || 1,488 || 1–2 || –
|- align="center" bgcolor="#ffcccc"
| 4 || February 20 || at Sam Houston State || Don Sanders Stadium • Huntsville, Texas || 3–6 || Beard (1–0) || Bragg (0–1) || Lusk (2) || 1,255 || 1–3 || –
|- align="center" bgcolor="#ffcccc"
| 5 || February 25 || vs #17 TCU || Globe Life Field • Arlington, Texas || 1–4 || Krob (1–0) || Perry (0–1) || Ridings (2) || 4,912 || 1–4 || –
|- align="center" bgcolor="#ffcccc"
| 6 || February 26 || vs #17 TCU || Globe Life Field • Arlington, Texas || 3–8 || Cornelio (1–0) || Schanaman (0–2) || Bolden (1) || 5,476 || 1–5 || –
|- align="center" bgcolor="#ffcccc"
| 7 || February 27 || vs #17 TCU || Globe Life Field • Arlington, Texas || 3–5 || Walker (2–0) || McCarville (0–1) || Ridings (3) || – || 1–6 || –
|-

|- align="center" bgcolor="#ccffcc"
| 8 || March 4 || vs Northwestern State || Clay Gould Ballpark • Arlington, Texas || 2–0 || Frank (1–0) || Carver (0–2) || Olson (1) || 200 || 2–6 || –
|- align="center" bgcolor="#ffcccc"
| 9 || March 4 || at UT Arlington || Clay Gould Ballpark • Arlington, Texas || 3–4 || Peters (1–0) || Gomes (0–1) || None  || 720 || 2–7 || –
|- align="center" bgcolor="#ccffcc"
| 10 || March 5 || vs Northwestern State || Clay Gould Ballpark • Arlington, Texas || 6–0 || Schanaman (1–2) || Harmon (1–1) || None || 311 || 3–7 || –
|- align="center" bgcolor="#ccffcc"
| 11 || March 5 || at UT Arlington || Clay Gould Ballpark • Arlington, Texas || 8–2 || McCarville (1–1) || Moffat (0–3) || None || 766 || 4–7 || –
|- align="center" bgcolor="#ffcccc"
| 12 || March 8 || at  || Tointon Family Stadium • Manhattan, Kansas || 4–6 || Hassall (1–2) || Olson (0–2) || Rothermel (1) || – || 4–8 || –
|- align="center" bgcolor="#dddddd"
| – || March 11 ||  || Haymarket Park • Lincoln, Nebraska ||colspan=12| Game cancelled 
|- align="center" bgcolor="#dddddd"
| – || March 12 || Long Beach State || Haymarket Park • Lincoln, Nebraska ||colspan=12| Game cancelled 
|- align="center" bgcolor="#dddddd"
| – || March 13 || Long Beach State || Haymarket Park • Lincoln, Nebraska ||colspan=12| Game cancelled 
|- align="center" bgcolor="#ffcccc"
| 13 || March 15 || at  || Tal Anderson Field • Omaha, Nebraska || 3–4 || Machado (2–1) || Perry (0–2) || None || 3,009 || 4–9 || –
|- align="center" bgcolor="#ccffcc"
| 14 || March 16 || Omaha || Haymarket Park • Lincoln, Nebraska || 6–5 || Bragg (1–1) || Howe (0–3) || None || 1,466 || 5–9 || –
|- align="center" bgcolor="#ccffcc"
| 15 || March 15 ||  || Haymarket Park • Lincoln, Nebraska || 12–6  || McCarville (2–1) || Blazek (1–2) || None || 4,901 || 6–9 || –
|- align="center" bgcolor="#ccffcc"
| 16 || March 16 || New Mexico State || Haymarket Park • Lincoln, Nebraska || 6–5 || Olson (1–2) || Rodriguez (0–2) || None || 5,043 || 7–9 || –
|- align="center" bgcolor="#ccffcc"
| 17 || March 18 || Texas A&M–Corpus Christi || Haymarket Park • Lincoln, Nebraska || 13–12 || Ornelas (2–0) || Nelson (0–1) || None || 4,407 || 8–9 || –
|- align="center" bgcolor="#ffcccc"
| 18 || March 19 || Texas A&M–Corpus Christi || Haymarket Park • Lincoln, Nebraska || 1–4 || Thomas (3–1) || Schanaman (1–3) || Garcia (2) || 5,446 || 8–10 || –
|- align="center" bgcolor="#ffcccc"
| 19 || March 20 || Texas A&M–Corpus Christi || Haymarket Park • Lincoln, Nebraska || 4–21 || Perez (2–1) || McCarville (2–2) || None || 5,627 || 8–11 || –
|- align="center" bgcolor="#dddddd"
| – || March 23 ||  || Haymarket Park • Lincoln, Nebraska ||colspan=12| Game cancelled
|- align="center" bgcolor="#ccffcc"
| 20 || March 25 || Michigan || Haymarket Park • Lincoln, Nebraska || 13–9 || Koty (2–0) || Rennard (2–1) || None || 5,109 || 9–11 || 1–0
|- align="center" bgcolor="#ffcccc"
| 21 || March 26 || Michigan || Haymarket Park • Lincoln, Nebraska || 6–8 || Allen (3–0) || Bragg (1–2) || None || 6,561 || 9–12 || 1–1
|- align="center" bgcolor="#ffcccc"
| 22 || March 27 || Michigan || Haymarket Park • Lincoln, Nebraska || 1–6 || Denner (3–2) || McCarville (2–3) || Rennard (2) || 5,075 || 9–13 || 1–2
|- align="center" bgcolor="#ffcccc"
| 23 || March 29 || at  || Charles Schwab Field Omaha • Omaha, Nebraska || 2–3 || Vetock (1–0) || Jelkin (0–1) || Steier (3) || 3,110 || 9–14 || 1–2
|-

|- align="center" bgcolor="#ccffcc"
| 24 || April 1 || at  || Bill Davis Stadium • Columbus, Ohio || 5–3 || Schanaman (2–3) || Coupet (2–3) || Bragg (2) || 1,370 || 10–14 || 2–2
|- align="center" bgcolor="#ccffcc"
| 25 || April 2 || at Ohio State || Bill Davis Stadium • Columbus, Ohio || 10–5 || Martin (1–0) || Haberthier (0–3) || None || 1,118 || 11–14 || 3–2
|- align="center" bgcolor="#ccffcc"
| 26 || April 3 || at Ohio State || Bill Davis Stadium • Columbus, Ohio || 17–5 || Jelkin (1–1) || Loncar (1–3) || None || 1,079 || 12–14 || 4–2
|- align="center" bgcolor="#ffcccc"
| 27 || April 6 || at Omaha || Tal Anderson Field • Omaha, Nebraska || 5–6 || Machado (4–1) || Christo (0–1) || Kreiling (1) || 1,585 || 12–15 || 4–2
|- align="center" bgcolor="#ffcccc"
| 28 || April 8 ||  || Haymarket Park • Lincoln, Nebraska || 5–7 || Kollar (6–0) || Schanaman (2–4) || None || 5,053 || 12–16 || 4–3
|- align="center" bgcolor="#ffcccc"
| 29 || April 9 || Rutgers || Haymarket Park • Lincoln, Nebraska || 4–5 || French (2–0) || Bragg (1–3) || Stanavich (7) || 5,852 || 12–17 || 4–4
|- align="center" bgcolor="#ffcccc"
| 30 || April 10 || Rutgers || Haymarket Park • Lincoln, Nebraska || 1–19 || Sinibaldi (2–0) || McCarville (2–4) || None || 5,282 || 12–18 || 4–5
|- align="center" bgcolor="#dddddd"
| – || April 12 || Creighton || Haymarket Park • Lincoln, Nebraska ||colspan=12| Game cancelled
|- align="center" bgcolor="#ccffcc"
| 31 || April 14 || BYU || Haymarket Park • Lincoln, Nebraska || 1–0 || Martin (2–0) || Sterner (3–2) || Bragg (3) || 4,382 || 13–18 || 4–5
|- align="center" bgcolor="#ffcccc"
| 32 || April 15 || BYU || Haymarket Park • Lincoln, Nebraska || 2–3 || Nielson (2–0) || Schanaman (2–5) || MaLaughlin (6) || 5,219 || 13–19 || 4–5
|- align="center" bgcolor="#ffcccc"
| 33 || April 15 || BYU || Haymarket Park • Lincoln, Nebraska || 6–7 || Smith (1–0) || Bragg (1–4) || Dahle (1) || 5,219 || 13–20 || 4–5
|- align="center" bgcolor="#ffcccc"
| 34 || April 16 || BYU || Haymarket Park • Lincoln, Nebraska || 3–4 || McKeehan (1–0) || Hawkins (0–1) || McLaughlin (7) || 5,005 || 13–21 || 4–5
|- align="center" bgcolor="#ccffcc"
| 35 || April 20 || North Dakota State || Haymarket Park • Lincoln, Nebraska || 4–3 || Hood (1–0) || Smith (0–2) || Bragg (4) || 4,462 || 14–21 || 4–5
|- align="center" bgcolor="#ffcccc"
| 36 || April 22 || at Indiana || Bart Kaufman Field • Bloomington, Indiana || 7–8 || Perkins (3–2) || Schanaman (2–6) || Tucker (4) || 1,655 || 14–22 || 4–6
|- align="center" bgcolor="#ffcccc"
| 37 || April 23 || at Indiana || Bart Kaufman Field • Bloomington, Indiana || 1–8 || Brehmer (4–2) || Olson (1–3) || Sharp (1) || 1,751 || 14–23 || 4–7
|- align="center" bgcolor="#ccffcc"
| 38 || April 24 || at Indiana || Bart Kaufman Field • Bloomington, Indiana || 19–7 || Frank (3–0) || Holderfield (2–3) || None || 1,973 || 15–23 || 5–7
|- align="center" bgcolor="#ccffcc"
| 39 || April 26 || Kansas State || Haymarket Park • Lincoln, Nebraska || 8–6 || Hood (2–0) || Ruhl (2–2) || Bragg (5) || 5,353 || 16–23 || 5–7
|- align="center" bgcolor="#ccffcc"
| 40 || April 27 || Omaha || Haymarket Park • Lincoln, Nebraska || 14–3 || McCarville (3–4) || Sellers (3–1) || None || 4,867 || 17–23 || 5–7
|- align="center" bgcolor="#ffcccc"
| 41 || April 29 || Iowa || Haymarket Park • Lincoln, Nebraska || 0–1 || Mazur (5–3) || Schanaman (2–7) || None || 4,835 || 17–24 || 5–8
|-

|- align="center" bgcolor="#ccffcc"
| 42 || May 1 || Iowa || Haymarket Park • Lincoln, Nebraska || 12–1 || Olson (2–3) || Schultz (2–1) || None || 5,741 || 18–24 || 6–8
|- align="center" bgcolor="#ffcccc"
| 43 || May 1 || Iowa || Haymarket Park • Lincoln, Nebraska || 3–5 || Nedved (5–2) || Bragg (1–5) || Beutel (2) || 5,741 || 18–25 || 6–9
|- align="center" bgcolor="#ccffcc"
| 44 || May 6 || at  || Siebert Field • Minneapolis, Minnesota || 12–5 || Frank (4–0) || Ireland (4–5) || None || 606 || 19–25 || 7–9
|- align="center" bgcolor="#ffcccc"
| 45 || May 7 || at Minnesota || Siebert Field • Minneapolis, Minnesota || 8–9 || Culliver (1–1) || Bragg (1–6) || None || 1,272 || 19–26 || 7–10
|- align="center" bgcolor="#ffcccc"
| 46 || May 8 || at Minnesota || Siebert Field • Minneapolis, Minnesota || 1–3 || Maldonado (2–3) || McCarville (3–5) || Liffrig (1) || 504 || 19–27 || 7–11
|- align="center" bgcolor="#ffcccc"
| 47 || May 13 || at  || Illinois Field • Champaign, Illinois || 3–8 || Kirschsieper (7–2) || Schanaman (2–8) || None || 3,089 || 19–28 || 7–12
|- align="center" bgcolor="#ccffcc"
| 48 || May 14 || at Illinois || Illinois Field • Champaign, Illinois || 11–2 || Olson (3–3) || Gowens (5–3) || None || 789 || 20–28 || 8–12
|- align="center" bgcolor="#ffcccc"
| 49 || May 15 || at Illinois || Illinois Field • Champaign, Illinois || 4–5 || Green (2–2) || Hawkins (0–2) || None || 802 || 20–29 || 8–13
|- align="center" bgcolor="#ccffcc"
| 50 || May 17 ||  || Haymarket Park • Lincoln, Nebraska || 9–5 || 'McCarville (4–5) || Archambo (5–2) || Ornelas (1) || 4,480 || 21–29 || 8–13
|- align="center" bgcolor="#ffcccc"
| 51 || May 19 ||  || Haymarket Park • Lincoln, Nebraska || 1–4 || Tomasic (4–4) || Brockett (0–1) || Bischoff (12) || 4,993 || 21–30 || 8–14
|- align="center" bgcolor="#ccffcc"
| 52 || May 20 || Michigan State || Haymarket Park • Lincoln, Nebraska || 6–3 || Frank (5–0) || Rush (3–3) || None || 5,602 || 22–30 || 9–14
|- align="center" bgcolor="#ccffcc"
| 53 || May 21 || Michigan State || Haymarket Park • Lincoln, Nebraska || 10–9 || Bragg (2–6) || Szczepaniak (4–3) || Hood (1) || 5,900 || 23–30 || 10–14
|-

Rankings

Awards

Big Ten Conference Players of the Week

Conference awards

References

Nebraska
Nebraska Cornhuskers baseball seasons
Nebraska